The Kuanjie Protestant Church is a state church in the Dongcheng District of Beijing, China. It is operated by the  Three-Self Patriotic Movement.

References

External links
Kuanjie Protestant Church at the China Internet Information Center

Churches in Beijing
Three-Self Patriotic Movement